Electrostrymon is a genus of Neotropical butterflies in the family Lycaenidae.

Species
The following species are recognized in the genus:
Electrostrymon angelia  – fulvous hairstreak, angelic hairstreak
Electrostrymon angerona 
Electrostrymon canus 
Electrostrymon constantinoi 
Electrostrymon dominicana 
Electrostrymon denarius 
Electrostrymon ecbatana 
Electrostrymon endymion  – endymion hairstreak
Electrostrymon hugon  – ruddy hairstreak
Electrostrymon joya  – muted hairstreak
Electrostrymon mathewi 
Electrostrymon minikyanos 
Electrostrymon pan 
Electrostrymon perisus 
Electrostrymon picoloro 
Electrostrymon thurman

References

Eumaeini
Lycaenidae of South America
Lycaenidae genera